Hollow Point is a 1996 film directed by Sidney J. Furie and starring Thomas Ian Griffith, Tia Carrere, John Lithgow, and Donald Sutherland.

Plot
An FBI agent and a former DEA agent team up with a cunning hitman to foil a crazed mob boss's plans for world domination.

Cast
 Thomas Ian Griffith as Max Parrish
 Tia Carrere as Diane Norwood
 John Lithgow as Thomas Livingston
 Donald Sutherland as Garrett Lawton

External links

1996 films
Films directed by Sidney J. Furie
1996 action thriller films
Canadian action thriller films
1990s English-language films
1990s Canadian films